Victor Li Tzar-kuoi is a Hong Kong businessman, the chair of the board and group co-managing director of CK Hutchison Holdings Limited and the chairman of the board and managing director of CK Asset Holdings Limited and the Chairman of CK Infrastructure Holdings Limited. He is the elder son of tycoon Li Ka-shing and the brother of Richard Li.

Early years
Victor was born at his parents' family house in Deepwater Bay, Hong Kong on 1 August 1964, attended the St. Paul's Co-educational College in Hong Kong, and holds a BSc degree in Civil Engineering and a MSc degree in Civil Engineering from Stanford University and an honorary degree, Doctor of Laws, honoris causa (LL.D.) from University of Western Ontario.

Kidnapping 
Victor Li was kidnapped in 1996 on his way home after work by notorious gangster "Big Spender" Cheung Tze-keung. Victor's father, Li Ka-shing, paid a ransom of HK$1.038 billion, directly to Cheung who had come to Li Ka-shing's house. Victor Li is said to have been released after one night. A report was never filed with Hong Kong police. Instead the case was pursued by Mainland authorities, leading to Big Spender's execution in 1998, an outcome not possible under Hong Kong law. Rumours circulated of a deal between Li Ka-Shing and the Mainland. This suggestion, when brought to Li, was brushed off.

Business career
Victor Li currently holds the following positions:

 Chairman and Group Co-managing director of CK Hutchison Holdings Limited
 Chairman and managing director of CK Asset Holdings Limited
 Chairman of CK Infrastructure Holdings Limited
 Chairman of CK Life Sciences Int'l., (Holdings) Inc.
 Non-executive Director of Power Assets Holdings Limited
 Deputy Chairman of HK Electric Investments Limited
 Deputy Chairman of Li Ka Shing Foundation Limited, Li Ka Shing (Overseas) Foundation and Li Ka Shing (Canada) Foundation
 Co-Chairman of Husky Energy Inc.
 Director of the Hongkong and Shanghai Banking Corporation

Other positions
Victor Li serves as a member of the Standing Committee of the 13th National Committee of the Chinese People's Political Consultative Conference. 

Li is a member of the Chief Executive's Council of Advisers on Innovation and Strategic Development of the Hong Kong Special Administrative Region. Li is the Vice Chairman of the Hong Kong General Chamber of Commerce, and is Honorary Consul, for Barbados in Hong Kong.

See also
 List of kidnappings

References

1960s missing person cases
1964 births
Air Canada people
Alumni of St. Paul's Co-educational College
CK Hutchison Holdings people
Formerly missing people
Hong Kong chief executives
Hong Kong emigrants to Canada
Hong Kong financial businesspeople
Kidnapped Hong Kong people
Living people
Members of the Election Committee of Hong Kong, 2007–2012
Members of the Election Committee of Hong Kong, 2012–2017
Members of the Election Committee of Hong Kong, 2017–2021
Members of the 13th Chinese People's Political Consultative Conference
Members of the National Committee of the Chinese People's Political Consultative Conference
Missing person cases in China
Naturalized citizens of Canada
Stanford University alumni
Members of the 14th Chinese People's Political Consultative Conference